Mai Nakamura may refer to the following Olympic medalists from Japan:

, Japanese swimmer
, Japanese synchronized swimmer